The Honorable Sunil Sabharwal, following confirmation by the US Senate, served as the USA Board member to the International Monetary Fund between February 2016 and April 2018. He was initially nominated by the White House on April 3, 2014, and received Senate confirmation on February 12, 2016. He is an independent business investor and advisor of Indian-Hungarian descent who escaped from the Hungarian People's Republic in 1983 and returned in 1992 after the collapse of communism to set up the Budapest office of the European Bank for Reconstruction and Development (EBRD). Most recently, he was chairman of the Board of Earthport plc., a company listed on the London Stock Exchange AIM Market. He joined the Board in September 2018, became Interim Chairman in October. Subsequently, he shepherded the sale of the company to Visa Inc., following a takeover battle with MasterCard and was able to achieve a final sale price of more than four times the value of the company. Previously, he was chairman of the Board of Ogone, a European internet payment services company with headquarters in Brussels, Belgium.  A former NCAA All-American and Big Ten Champion in fencing, Sabharwal currently serves on a commission of the International Olympic Committee, is Secretary General of the International Fair Play Committee and has been recently elected to the executive board of World Athletics. He speaks publicly on investing in Central and Eastern Europe, the confluence of sport, business, financial technology (FinTech), and the role of international financial institutions in a changing economy.

Early life and education 

He was born in 1964 in New Delhi, India to Baldev Raj Sabharwal, a printing entrepreneur who founded the New Roxy Press in New Delhi, and Gabriella de Bessenyey, of Hungarian descent.  The de Bessenyey clan is one of the oldest Hungarian noble families tracing its lineage back to at least the 14th century, with documentary evidence of it being given a right to a Coat of Arms by the monarch from the 15th century. On occasion, literature refers to Sunil as Sabharwal de Bessenyey. He attended the Frank Anthony School in New Delhi, India and the Dob Utca Elementary School and Imre Madach High School in Budapest, Hungary.

Escape from People's Republic of Hungary 

Sabharwal's mother struggled in Hungary under the communist regime because she refused to join the communist party.  When she tried to sell pottery to feed her family, authorities would not grant her a vendor's license. The family went to Vienna during the summer of 1983 under the auspices of a cultural tour and pleaded for asylum at the US Embassy, citing political and religious oppression. They gained sponsorship from the Upper Arlington Lutheran Church in Columbus, Ohio, with particular support from Ohio State Professor of Finance David Cole and his wife Edie and arrived in Columbus in December 1983.  Once in the Columbus Hungarian-American network, Sabharwal met OSU fencing coach and Hungarian Charlotte Remenyik.

Education 

Sabharwal enrolled at the Ohio State University in January 1984, excelling in both business administration studies and fencing. He was OSU's 1984 Big Ten Champion and NCAA All-American in 1984 and 1986. In 1988 he won OSU's Jack Stephenson Award for Outstanding Scholastic and Academic Achievement at the College of Business and graduated cum laude with a Bachelor of Science degree with Distinction in Marketing. He earned his Master of Science degree in management at London Business School in 1996 and a diploma in Company Direction from UK's Institute of Directors in 2009.

Return to Post-Communist Hungary 

In 1992 he returned to post-Communist Hungary to set up the Budapest office of the European Bank for Reconstruction and Development (EBRD), an international finance institution created specifically to foster the transition of post-Soviet economies backed by the developed world. Soon after its establishment the EBRD became the largest investor in Central and Eastern Europe and Hungary, one of its largest fund recipients.

Financial Services Sector Career 

Sabharwal had a 10-year private equity and mergers and acquisitions career with GE Capital in London and First Data / Western Union, in London and Paris.  He served on the board of Euromedic Euromedic, Central Europe's largest private healthcare services organization.

Current 

Sabharwal resides in Washington, D.C. independently advising and co-investing with private equity firms and financial services corporations. He is married and has two children.

Civic works 

He is a member of the International Olympic Committee’s Sport and Environment Sustainability & Legacy Commission chaired by HSH Prince Albert of Monaco II. Sabharwal is Secretary General, of the UNESCO- and IOC-affiliated International Fair Play Committee. He also has served on the board of Peace & Sport USA and the US and International Fencing Federation. He was Chairman of the International Fencing Federation's (FIE) first annual Congress held in the US, in Philadelphia in 2011 and was Chief of Mission to the US Olympic Fencing team at the Beijing Olympics in 2008.

References 

Hungarian people of Indian descent
1964 births
International Olympic Committee members
Living people